Craig McGrath may refer to:
 Craig McGrath (Australian footballer) (born 1963), Australian rules footballer
 Craig McGrath (rugby union) (born 1974), New Zealand rugby union player